Massar may refer to:

People
 Frank Massar, British martial artist
 Kathryn Johnston Massar, Little League baseball player
 Robert J. Massar, founding partner of Dearborn-Massar

Other
 18946 Massar, an asteroid
Al-Massar, an alternate name for Tunisian political party Social Democratic Path
 Massar Egbari, Egyptian band

See also 
 Masar (disambiguation)